Love And Action In Chicago is a 1999 American action romantic comedy starring Courtney B. Vance, Regina King and Kathleen Turner.  The film, written and directed by Dwayne Johnson-Cochran, in  his directorial debut, focuses on a celibate hired assassin finding love with a quirky accountant in Chicago.

Cast
Courtney B. Vance ...  Eddie Jones 
Regina King ...  Lois Newton 
Kathleen Turner ...  Middleman 
Jason Alexander ...  Frank Bonner 
Edward Asner ...  Taylor 
Robert Breuler ...  Oli 
Michael Gilio ...  Martin 
David Basulto ...  Bob 
Mindy Bell ...  Secretary 
JoBe Cerny ...  Mr. Jensen 
Patrice Pitman Quinn ... Linda
Tom Lowell ... FBI Man

References

External links
 
 
 
 https://variety.com/1999/film/reviews/love-and-action-in-chicago-2-1200459447/

1999 films
Films shot in Chicago
Films set in Chicago
1990s action films
American independent films
American romantic comedy films
Films shot in Michigan
1999 romantic comedy films
1999 directorial debut films
1990s English-language films
1990s American films